Pekka Oinonen (born. 23 January 1944 Helsinki) is a Finnish Foreign Affairs Counselor who served as Ambassador to Sofia from 1990–1992, Tallinn from 1996-2001 and Dublin from 2001–2005. Since 2007, he has been Deputy Director of the Legal Department of the Ministry for Foreign Affairs.

Oinonen started working at the Ministry of Foreign Affairs in 1969, where he has also worked in the Administrative Department, the Development Cooperation Department and the Department of Commerce in addition to the Legal Department. From 1982-1985, he was a cabinet justice at the Ministry of Trade and Industry. He also worked as an inspector of foreign affairs from 1992–1996.

References
Nimitykset, ulkoasiainministeriö, viitattu 27.9.2010
Diplomaatin työ on tietojen vaihtoa, Hs.fi, viitattu 27.9.2010

1944 births
Living people
Diplomats from Helsinki
Ambassadors of Finland to Bulgaria
Ambassadors of Finland to Estonia
Ambassadors of Finland to Ireland